These are the official results of the Men's shot put event at the 2002 European Championships in Munich, Germany. There were a total number of 27 participating athletes. The final and the qualification round were both held on Tuesday August 6, 2002, with the qualifying mark set at 20.20 metres.

Medalists

Schedule
All times are Central European Time (UTC+1)

Abbreviations
All results shown are in metres

Records

Qualification

Group A

Group B

Final

See also
 1999 Men's World Championships Shot Put (Seville)
 2000 Men's Olympic Shot Put (Sydney)
 2001 Men's World Championships Shot Put (Edmonton)
 2002 Shot Put Year Ranking
 2003 Men's World Championships Shot Put (Paris)
 2004 Men's Olympic Shot Put (Athens)
 2005 Men's World Championships Shot Put (Helsinki)

References
 Results
 todor66
 throwing.narod
 Results European Championships Athletic 1934-2010 

Shot put
Shot put at the European Athletics Championships